Pearce Paul Creasman (born 1981) is an archaeologist in the fields of Egyptology, maritime archaeology, and dendrochronology. In recognition of his work he has been made a fellow of the Explorer's Club, the Royal Geographical Society, and the Linnean Society, among others. From 2009 to 2020, he was a professor and curator at the University of Arizona, where he served as director of the Egyptian Expedition. Beginning in 2020, he was appointed executive director of the American Center of Oriental Research. He has been conducting archaeological and environmental research in Egypt and Sudan since 2004 and is editor of the peer-reviewed Journal of Ancient Egyptian Interconnections. Prof. Creasman is author or co-author of more than 100 articles and edited books and has been awarded more than 60 competitive research grants, including from the National Geographic Society, the National Science Foundation, and the Save America's Treasures program. He has held a number of professional offices and received several academic and educational honors and awards, including recognition from the White House's Office of Science and Technology Policy  and National Geographic . He earned his doctorate from the Nautical Archaeology Program at Texas A&M University.
Prof. Creasman and his colleagues previously excavated the royal Theban temple of the pharaoh Tausret, a queen who ruled independently as king at the end of the 19th Dynasty, and is now primarily excavating at the pyramids and royal cemetery of Nuri, Sudan. His primary research interests are maritime life in ancient Egypt, Sudanese/Egyptian archaeology, underwater archaeology, and human/environment interactions. He is best known for his work regarding ancient maritime life and studies of human/environmental interactions.

Seminal Publications 

Books
 Culture in Crisis: Flows of People, Artifacts & Ideas 2 vols. (editor, with F. Balaawi and C.L. Sulosky Weaver), Department of Antiquities, Hashemite Kingdom of Jordan (2022).
 Origins and Afterlives of Kush (editor, with S.T. Smith), The Egyptian Expedition (2022).
 Udjahorresnet and His World: Diplomacy in the Ancient Near East (editor, with M. Wasmuth), The Egyptian Expedition (2020).
 Pharaoh's Land and Beyond: Ancient Egypt and Its Neighbors (editor, with R.H. Wilkinson), Oxford University Press (2017).
 Flora Trade Between Egypt and Africa in Antiquity (editor with I. Incordino), Oxbow Books (2017).
 Archaeological Research in the Valley of the Kings and Ancient Thebes (editor), Wilkinson Egyptology Series I. (2013).

Articles
 "The Temple of the Winged Lions, Petra: Reassessing a Nabataean Ritual Complex," with Piraud-Fournet, P., Green, J.D.M., and N. Doyle  Near Eastern Archaeology  84.4: 293-305 (2021).
 "(Re)Examining the tomb of Queen Yeturow at Nuri," with Strong, M.E., Doll, S., Hassan Abdullah, F., O’Brien, H., Petacchi, S., and Breidenstein, A.M.  Sudan & Nubia  25: 193-203 (2021).
 "Reconstructing Egypt's Paleoecology and Paleoclimate," in  The Gift of the Nile? Ancient Egypt and the Environment Conference held at the University of British Columbia  eds T. Schneider and C. Johnson, 181-196 (2020).
 "The Relationship Between Solar Activity and Δ14C Peaks in AD 775, AD 994 and 660 BC," with Park, J., S. Fahrni, J. Southon, and R. Mewaldt. Radiocarbon  59.4: 1147-1156 (2017).
 "Hatshepsut and the Politics of Punt,"  African Archaeological Review  31.3: 395-405 (2015).
 "Foundation or Completion? The Status of Pharaoh-Queen Tausret's Temple of Millions of Years," with W.R. Johnson, J.B. McClain, R.H. Wilkinson.  Near Eastern Archaeology  77.4: 274-283 (2014). 
 "Ship Timber and the Reuse of Wood in Ancient Egypt,"  Journal of Egyptian History  6.2: 152-176 (2013).
 "Reflections on the Foundation, Persistence, and Growth of the Laboratory of Tree-Ring Research, circa 1930-1960," with B. Bannister, R.H. Towner, J.S. Dean, and S.W. Leavitt, Tree-Ring Research 68.2 (2012): 81-89.
 "Basic Principles and Methods of Dendrochronological Specimen Curation," Tree-Ring Research 67.2 (2011): 103-115.
  "A Further Investigation of the Cairo Dahshur Boats,"  Journal of Egyptian Archaeology 96 (2010): 101-124, pl. II.

References 

1981 births
Living people
American Egyptologists
University of Arizona faculty
American expatriates in Egypt